Otto Bron (1898 – 1980) was a Swiss wrestler. He competed in the freestyle middleweight event at the 1920 Summer Olympics.

References

External links
 

1898 births
1980 deaths
Olympic wrestlers of Switzerland
Wrestlers at the 1920 Summer Olympics
Swiss male sport wrestlers
Place of birth missing